James E. Birch may refer to:
 James E. Birch (entrepreneur) (1827–1857), stagecoach line entrepreneur in California
 James Birch (politician) (1849–1941), merchant, horse breeder and political figure in Prince Edward Island